Anthony  Stovall (born February 21, 1982) is a former professional American soccer player.

Career

College and Amateur
Stovall grew up in Columbia, South Carolina, attended Ridge View High School, and played college soccer at the University of South Carolina.

During his college years he also played with both Greenville Lions and the Southern California Seahorses in the USL Premier Development League.

Professional
Stovall began his professional career in 2005 after the conclusion of 2005 PDL season signing a development contract with Chivas USA. He was signed after an standout performance in a reserve match against Chivas USA. He made appearances in 6 matches and was released due to a shoulder injury suffered in a reserve match.

He then joined the Charlotte Eagles of the USL Second division in 2006. The next season, he made the move to the Cleveland City Stars of the USL First Division in 2007. After two successful seasons in Cleveland he made the move to Europe play with a few clubs. Belgian Pro League 1st Division Club A.F.C. Tubize and trials with German clubs SG Sonnenhof Großaspach and TSG Hoffenheim. After a short stint in Europe, he returned to Cleveland city stars for the 2009 season.

After missing the 2010 season to coach, he made the decision to play the 2011 season. After trialing with several teams, on April 12, 2011, Stovall signed a 21 day contract with Rochester Rhinos of the USL Pro league.
Before his contract end he announced his desire to continue coaching.

Personal
Anthony is married to Jennifer Stovall and they currently reside in Southwest Florida. Stovall has 4 kids, Natalie ( 2010), Kingston (2014), Roman (2016), London (2017).

References

External links
 Cleveland City Stars bio

1982 births
Living people
American soccer players
Charlotte Eagles players
Cleveland City Stars players
Greenville Lions players
Rochester New York FC players
SG Sonnenhof Großaspach players
South Carolina Gamecocks men's soccer players
Southern California Seahorses players
USL First Division players
USL League Two players
USL Second Division players
Association football midfielders
Soccer players from Louisiana
American expatriate sportspeople in Belgium
American expatriate soccer players in Germany
Sportspeople from Columbia, South Carolina
Soccer players from South Carolina
Sportspeople from New Orleans
American expatriate soccer players